Bat ear may refer to:
Protruding ear, an abnormally protruding human ear
A shape of dog ear; see Canine terminology
The ear of a bat, used for echolocation
The ear of a nocturnal insect, primarily used to detect calls from insectivorous bats

See also
Bat-eared fox